USS Daring (AM-87) was  an  of the United States Navy.

Laid down on 12 March 1942 by the Commercial Iron Works of Portland, Oregon, the ship was launched on 23 May 1942, and commissioned on 10 October 1942. Daring was reclassified as a PC-461-class submarine chaser, PC-1591, on 1 June 1944.

World War II Pacific Theatre Operations  
Sailing from San Francisco, California, 2 February 1943, Daring arrived at Pearl Harbor 12 February for service as local escort and school ship, and sweeping mines until 5 March when she was underway for Noumea. From 24 March 1943 until 25 November 1944 Daring remained in the southwest Pacific on inter-island escort duty and anti-submarine patrol, taking part in the invasion of the Treasury Islands on 6 November 1943. She was reclassified as the submarine chaser PC-1591 and her name cancelled 1 June 1944.

As a submarine chaser 
Arriving at Ulithi on 9 December 1944, PC-1591 escorted convoys to Guam, Saipan, Leyte, and the Palaus until 7 March 1945. She screened  on a survey of Casiguran Bay, Luzon between 10 March and 5 April, then put into Saipan on 14 April. From 13 May to 24 August she escorted convoys between Saipan and Iwo Jima, and on 13 October cleared Saipan for the west coast, arriving at San Francisco, California, 13 November.

Post-war deactivation 
She was decommissioned at Mare Island, California on 22 January 1946 and transferred to the Maritime Commission for disposal 18 March 1948.

Awards  
PC-1591 received one battle star for World War II service.

References

External links
 

 

Adroit-class minesweepers
Ships built in Portland, Oregon
1942 ships
World War II minesweepers of the United States
World War II patrol vessels of the United States